Hozabejas is a hamlet which belongs to the municipality of Rucandio, Burgos, Spain. It had a reported population of 13 in 2017.

References

Populated places in the Province of Burgos
Towns in Spain